França ( — France in the Portuguese language) is a Portuguese surname. Notable people with the surname include:

 António França (born 1938), Angolan footballer and politician
 Carlos França (born 1980), Brazilian footballer
 Felipe França Silva (born 1987), Brazilian swimmer
 Ivan Carlos França Coelho (born 1989), Brazilian footballer
 Jymmy França (born 1984), Brazilian footballer
 Lucas França (born 1996), Brazilian footballer
 Márcio França (born 1963), Brazilian politician

See also
 Franca (disambiguation)

Portuguese-language surnames